The white-bellied green pigeon (Treron sieboldii) is a species of bird in the family Columbidae. It is found in China, Japan, South Korea, Laos, Russia, Taiwan, Thailand, India and Vietnam.
Its natural habitat is temperate forests.

The pigeon is known for its unusual habit of drinking saltwater. A well-known location where the pigeons do this in Japan is Terugasaki in Ōiso in Kanagawa Prefecture.

References

white-bellied green pigeon
Birds of Japan
Birds of South China
Birds of Taiwan
Birds of Laos
Birds of Vietnam
white-bellied green pigeon
Taxonomy articles created by Polbot